Thomas Dwight (October 29, 1758 – January 2, 1819) was a United States representative from Massachusetts.

Life
Thomas Dwight was born in Springfield in the Province of Massachusetts Bay on October 29, 1758.

Early life
Dwight's father was Colonel Josiah Dwight (1715–1768) of the New England Dwight family, and mother was  Elizabeth Buckminster (1731–1798). He was the oldest of five siblings.

Education
Dwight pursued preparatory studies, and graduated from Harvard College in 1778.  Dwight  studied law, was admitted to the bar and commenced practice in Springfield.

Family life
On April 14, 1791, Dwight married Hannah Worthington. She was born June 17, 1761, with maternal grandfather Reverend Samuel Hopkins (1721–1803).
Dwight was elected to the Massachusetts House of Representatives 1794–1795, and to the Massachusetts Senate for two terms, from 1796 to 1803 and 1814 to 1818.

Dwight was elected as a Federalist to the Eighth Congress from March 4, 1803, to March 3, 1805.  Dwight served as selectman of the town of Springfield, and was a member of the Governor's council.  He retired from political life and engaged in the practice of his profession in Springfield until his death on January 2, 1819.  His interment was in Peabody Cemetery.

His widow died July 10, 1833. Their children were:
 Mary Stoddard Dwight was born January 26, 1792, married John Howard on December 18, 1818, and died July 20, 1836. They had four daughters.
 John Worthington Dwight was born October 31, 1793, and died February 12, 1836, unmarried.
 Elizabeth Buckminster Dwight was born February 18, 1801, married Charles Howard, and died October 7, 1855. They had six children.

References 

1758 births
1819 deaths
Harvard College alumni
Members of the Massachusetts House of Representatives
Members of the Massachusetts Governor's Council
Massachusetts state senators
Politicians from Springfield, Massachusetts
Massachusetts lawyers
Federalist Party members of the United States House of Representatives from Massachusetts
19th-century American lawyers